Anhui is a province of China, known musically for a wide array of folk and classical styles.  The Huangmei opera, though originally from Hubei, has a long history in Anhui, especially Anqing City, from which it spread to Beijing, Shanghai and elsewhere. A notable Huangmei opera figure was Yan Fengying. Huangmei opera has become internationally renowned, especially following the 1986 performance of an adaptation of William Shakespeare's Much Ado About Nothing by the Anhui Provincial Huangmei Opera Troupe.  There is also a less common form of Hui opera.

Anhui's folk styles have been brought to new audiences by the singer Baoluo, who was also a major figure in the 1980s Beijing punk rock scene (and a member of Self-Education).

Anhui